Sam Vaka (born 26 October 1992) is a New Zealand rugby union player who currently plays as a midfield back for  in the ITM Cup.   Solid domestic performances for them over the course of 3 seasons saw him named in the  wider training group ahead of the 2016 Super Rugby season.

Vaka was an All Blacks Sevens representative in 2014 and 2015.

References

1992 births
Living people
New Zealand rugby union players
Rugby union centres
Counties Manukau rugby union players
Rugby union players from Auckland
Male rugby sevens players
New Zealand Christians
Chiefs (rugby union) players
Rugby union wings
Rugby union fullbacks
SU Agen Lot-et-Garonne players
Tonga international rugby union players
Kyuden Voltex players